Targeting may refer to:

Biology
 Gene targeting
 Protein targeting

Marketing
 Behavioral targeting
 Targeted advertising
 Target market
 Geotargeting, in internet marketing

Other uses
 Targeting (gridiron football), a penalty
 Targeting (politics), to determine where to spend the resources of time, money, manpower and attention when campaigning for election
 Targeting (video games), a controversial strategy in online gaming where a player continuously attacks the same opponent 
 Targeting (warfare), to select objects or installations to be attacked, taken, or destroyed
 Targeting pod, in warfare
 Targeting tower, a radio frequency antenna
 Geographic targeting
 Inflation targeting, in economics

See also
 Goal (disambiguation)
 Target (disambiguation)